Per Christian Münstermann (born 9 February 1999) is an German professional road and track racing cyclist, who currently rides for UCI Continental team .

Career 
Athletically, Per Christian Münstermann started with athletics before switching to cycling in 2010. In 2011 he joined the team SG Radschläger Düsseldorf.

In 2016 he became the German Junior Champion in the omnium in Cottbus, finished second in the points race and third in the individual pursuit. The following year, he won the title in the Madison as well as the National Championship in the team time trial with the Rose Team NRW Junior Team in Genthin. At the Junior Track World Championships the same year, he finished fourth in the Madison with Rico Brückner.

In 2018, Münstermann received a contract with UCI Continental team . In the same year, he finished eighth at the German National Road Race Championships as part of the Three Countries Championship in the U23 road race.

Awards 
In 2017, Münstermann was honored as Düsseldorf's "Junior Sportsman of the Year". Also in 2017, he was awarded the "Golden Lion" as Sportsman of the Year in his native town of Düren.

Major Results

Track 

2016
 National Junior Championships
1st  Omnium
2nd Points race
3rd Individual pursuit
3rd Team pursuit
2017
 National Junior Championships
1st  Madison (with Nils Weispfennig)
2nd Team pursuit
3rd Individual pursuit
2022
 3rd Team pursuit, National Championships

Road 

2016
 1st  Team time trial, National Junior Championships
2017
 1st  Team time trial, National Junior Championships
2020
 9th International Rhodes Grand Prix
2021
 1st  Team time trial, National Championships
 1st 30. Spee Cup Genthin
2022
 1st GP Flahaut

External links

References

1999 births
Living people
German male cyclists
German track cyclists
People from Düren